Berwickshire, Roxburgh and Selkirk is a constituency of the British House of Commons, located in the south of Scotland within the Scottish Borders council area. It elects one Member of Parliament (MP) at least once every five years using the first-past-the-post system of voting.

The constituency name comes from the three counties it covers; Berwickshire, Roxburghshire and Selkirkshire.

A mostly rural constituency, it includes the towns of Coldstream, Duns, Eyemouth, Galashiels, Hawick, Jedburgh, Kelso, Melrose and Selkirk.

Boundaries

As created by the Fifth Review of the Boundary Commission for Scotland. The Berwickshire, Roxburgh and Selkirk constituency covers part of the Scottish Borders council area. The rest of the council area is covered by the Dumfriesshire, Clydesdale and Tweeddale constituency, which also covers part of the Dumfries and Galloway council area and part of the South Lanarkshire council area.

The Berwickshire, Roxburgh and Selkirk constituency is predominantly rural, and incorporates the electoral wards of:

In full: Hawick and Hermitage, Selkirkshire, Hawick and Denholm, Jedburgh and District, Kelso and District, Mid Berwickshire, East Berwickshire, Leaderdale and Melrose, Galashiels and District
In part: Tweeddale East

History

Michael Moore held the seat from its creation in 2005, and was MP for the predecessor seat of Tweeddale, Ettrick & Lauderdale from 1997 to 2005. The seat and its predecessor seats (Roxburgh and Berwickshire and Tweeddale, Ettrick & Lauderdale) had a strong Liberal Party presence since the 1960s, with former Liberal leader David Steel having represented the seat from 1965 to 1997. Historically, the Conservative Party has been the main challenger to the seat, and they currently hold the equivalent Holyrood seat. At the 2015 general election, Moore and the Liberal Democrats were pushed into third place in the constituency, and the seat was narrowly won by Calum Kerr of the Scottish National Party over the Conservative candidate, John Lamont, by 328 votes.

At the 2017 snap election, Lamont (who contested the seat for the fourth consecutive election) won the seat from Calum Kerr of the SNP by 11,060 votes - polling more votes than any other candidate in Scotland, and making it the safest Conservative seat in Scotland.

Two years later, at the 2019 general election, held in the wake of parliamentary deadlock and Brexit negotiations, the Conservatives called another election and achieved their best national result since 1987, winning a comfortable majority of 80 seats at the election, with Lamont being re-elected as MP for Berwickshire, Roxburgh and Selkirk. He held the seat with a reduced majority of 5,148 votes, due to a swing towards the SNP and Liberal Democrats.

Members of Parliament

Elections

Elections in the 2010s

Elections in the 2000s

References

Westminster Parliamentary constituencies in Scotland
Constituencies of the Parliament of the United Kingdom established in 2005
Politics of the Scottish Borders